William Oakley may refer to:

Bill Oakley (born 1966), American television writer and producer
Bill Oakley (comics) (1964–2004), letterer for comic books
G. William Oakley  (1937–2010), American theatrical producer-director-actor
William Oakley (footballer) (1873–1934), English footballer
William Oakley (Medal of Honor) (1860–1918), American soldier
William Oakley (cricketer) (1868–?), English cricketer
William Oakeley (MP) for Bishop's Castle in the 17th century
William Oakeley (1635–1695), English landowner and politician
William Edward Oakeley, quarry owner
William Oakley (Better Call Saul), fictional character

See also